A partial solar eclipse occurred on November 21, 1938. A solar eclipse occurs when the Moon passes between Earth and the Sun, thereby totally or partly obscuring the image of the Sun for a viewer on Earth. A partial solar eclipse occurs in the polar regions of the Earth when the center of the Moon's shadow misses the Earth.

Related eclipses

Solar eclipses 1935–1938

Notes

References

External links 

1938 11 21
1938 in science
1938 11 21
November 1938 events